Final Fight: Streetwise is a 2006 3D beat-'em-up produced by Capcom, released in North America and the PAL region for the PlayStation 2 and Xbox. It was developed by the American team of Capcom Production Studio 8 (the developers of Final Fight Revenge and the Maximo series). It is the sixth and final game of the Final Fight series as well as the only Final Fight video game to not be released in Japan. A PlayStation Portable version was also planned but ultimately cancelled. 

The game returned the series to its beat-'em-up roots, casting players as Kyle Travers, brother of Cody from the first game. Series regulars Haggar and Guy also make appearances in the game's story mode, which has Kyle battling a maniacal priest named Father Bella and the illegal drug "glow".

Gameplay
Final Fight: Streetwise is a 3D beat 'em up game. The story mode, which is exclusively single player, has ten minigames, including cockroach stomping, arm-wrestling, slide puzzles, shooting contests and the classic car bash.  Players earn money through pit fights and side missions, upgrading Kyle's moveset by training in various gyms in Metro City while progressing through the game.  An 'instinct' system allows you to counter opponents' attacks, as well as make your attacks more powerful.

The arcade mode is a no-frills 3D brawler for 1 or 2 players.  It does not have upgradable movesets, counters or instinct abilities. Kyle, Cody, Guy and Haggar are all playable characters in arcade mode. However, the game is over when the life bar is empty.

The game's save system can only be used once the player decides to quit the game. Progress will resume at the last checkpoint rather than the character's last position.

Plot
Streetwise is set several years after Final Fight 3, and focuses on Kyle Travers (voiced by Trent Kaniuga), Cody's younger brother.  In Streetwise, Kyle roams the streets of his hometown, doing detective work, on the search for his captured brother.  Kyle will run into familiar faces, as well as new ones.

Story
Kyle and Cody Travers are brothers who take part in the sport of underground fighting. As Cody Travers' younger brother, Kyle is the star of the underground Metro City fight club, spending nights fighting various other fighters in order to earn enough quick cash to make ends meet. After the end of a fight one evening, Kyle and Cody decide to meet at the local bar to celebrate with some beers and a round of pool; however, Cody has some unspoken business that delays his arrival for an hour. After Kyle arrives at the bar, he plays a game with his girlfriend and bar owner Vanessa Sims (whose brother is a member of the police department), while waiting for Cody. Kyle later finds out that Cody is using a powerful strength-enhancing drug called "glow", which helps the arthritis in his knees. Kyle later discovers that glow is being made by a psychotic priest named Father Bella, who hopes to use the drug to bring about the apocalypse. When Kyle finds Bella on the roof of his church, Cody is with him, mutated by a concentrated dose of glow. It is later revealed that Bella is actually the younger brother of Belger, the antagonist of the original game, just before he and Kyle begin to fight.

During the battle, Cody regains his senses, and throws himself and Bella off the roof landing in the courtyard. Bella regains consciousness from the fall and begins to reach for his handgun but is stopped by Kyle. Bella utters his last words "I am your savior," before Kyle fires a fatal shot directly to the former's head, replying "You're nothing."  Afterward he finds Cody unconscious from the fall.

Some time later, Kyle and Cody wake up in the hospital, where they meet with Vanessa whose brother was killed during the final battles; she holds onto her late brother's badge in his memory. Cody's arthritis is now gone and he seems eager to resume fighting. Kyle notices Dr. Chang, the creator of "glow", leaving the police station on the local news and mentions he has a feeling this might not be over quite yet.

Characters
The game's protagonist is Kyle Travers, younger brother of Cody Travers from the original Final Fight. He is a 27-year-old former Marine who has lived on the streets of Metro City, along with Cody, since childhood. Coming from a broken family, Kyle was brought up by his brother, who taught him how to survive life on the streets and earn respect. Haggar reveals that Kyle was a troublemaker and hoodlum prior to joining the military, calling him a "skinny legged punk". Later, as a skilled hand-to-hand fighter, Kyle uses his talent to support himself in the local pit fighting club. He goes in search of Cody after he is abducted from Kyle's girlfriend's bar. His girlfriend, Vanessa Sims, and her brother, Sergeant Sims, aid Kyle in his search by providing him with information as they get it.

Enemies include 2P, Andore (voiced by Gerardo Sprigg) and Cammy. The game's antagonist is Father Bella. He has been distributing a new drug called GLOW throughout Metro City. It is later revealed that he is the younger brother of Belger, the antagonist of the original Final Fight.

Development
Before Streetwise entered development, Capcom Studio 8 worked on a separate game for the PlayStation 2, titled Final Fight: Seven Sons, which had different characters, a different gameplay system, a simulated "railcam" and cel-shaded graphics, the latter two of which served to mimic the aesthetics of Final Fight and its SNES sequels.

A promotional comic that contained concept art, illustrated by artist and lead voice actor Trent Kaniuga, was included with preorders of the game.

As seen in the promotional comic, Sodom and Poison, both of whom were from the original Final Fight as well as Final Fight Revenge, were initially planned to be in Streetwise. It is unknown what their intended roles in the game were, or why they were cut from the final version. Additionally,  Mike Haggar and Guy were supposed to have more screen-time, but several cutscenes featuring them were eventually removed.

Soundtrack
As well as remixes of the original game's themes, the soundtrack was provided by RZA, Mos Def, Fear Factory, Slipknot, Soulfly, Dub Pistols, Shadows Fall, Opeth, Lil' Flip, Nappy Roots, Dujeous and Gizmachi.

Reception

Final Fight: Streetwise was widely panned by critics on both platforms according to the review aggregator website Metacritic. Many video game review websites and magazines, including IGN, GameSpot and Game Informer, have made several complaints about flaws in the game, usually ending with an unfavorable review. Many reviewers claimed that, while the game offers a simple and functional gameplay in the same vein of the original arcade game, it is easily overshadowed by the flaws in other departments.

ScrewAttack named the game as 6th on their list of "Top 10 Worst 2D to 3D Games" and also placed the game in the number five spot on their "Top 10 Worst Reboots or Remakes" list.

References

External links

Hardcore Gaming 101 Final Fight series review, including a different view on Final Fight: Streetwise 

2006 video games
3D beat 'em ups
Cancelled PlayStation Portable games
Capcom beat 'em ups
Cooperative video games
Final Fight games
Video games about ninja
Video games about siblings
Organized crime video games
PlayStation 2 games
Video games about the illegal drug trade
Video games adapted into comics
Video games developed in the United States
Video games set in the United States
Video game sequels
Xbox games
Multiplayer and single-player video games